The 2005–06 OK Liga was the 37th season of the top-tier league of rink hockey in Spain.

Barcelona Sorli Discau finished the league as champion.

Competition format
Sixteen teams joined the league.

The eight first teams at the end of the regular season qualified for the playoffs while the three last teams were relegated to Primera División.

Regular season

Playoffs
Quarterfinals were played with a best-of-three format, while semifinals and final were played with a best-of-five series.

Seeded teams played games 1, 2 and 5 of the series at home.

Final standings

Copa del Rey

The 2006 Copa del Rey was the 63rd edition of the Spanish men's roller hockey cup. It was played in Lloret de Mar between the seven first qualified teams after the first half of the season and Lloret as host team.

23 years after its last title, Alnimar Reus Deportiu won its 6th cup.

References

External links
Real Federación Española de Patinaje

OK Liga seasons
2006 in roller hockey
2005 in roller hockey
2006 in Spanish sport
2005 in Spanish sport